A Visitor to a Museum (translit. Posetitel muzeya) is a 1989 post-apocalyptic drama film directed and written by Konstantin Lopushansky. It was entered into the 16th Moscow International Film Festival where it won the Silver St. George and the Prix of Ecumenical Jury.

A Visitor to a Museum is the second in a collection of films dubbed the "Apocalypse Quartet" that are directed by Lopushansky that take place in apocalyptic or post-apocalyptic settings. The other films in the quartet are Dead Man's Letters (1986), Russian Symphony (1994), and The Ugly Swans (2006).

Plot
In a post-apocalyptic world after a global environmental disaster, the remnants of humanity are living out their century, indifferent to the fate of the planet, and are in no way trying to stop the catastrophe. Among the humans are a caste of "degenerates", humans that are significantly intellectual disabled.

The main character comes to the sea, which periodically overflows, then dries up. He wants to look at the ancient sunken city, which will appear on the surface when the sea parted again. Waiting for this moment, he talks to the locals. He discovers that the "ordinary" people, the innkeepers, have lost what remains of their spirituality and are silencing their spiritual hunger with entertainment. They discourage him from going to the ancient city, beckoning him to stay with them, listen to music, watch television, feast, and dance. The housewife seduces him, and they have sex.

At the same time, the degenerates retained religion and a semblance of spirituality. One of the degenerates the innkeepers' maid, believes that the Visitor is a savior sent by God, and begs him not to leave, not to abandon his quest. The hero, at her invitation, attends a nightly service of degenerates, at which the crowd begs God to take them from the post-apocalyptic world to heaven. This leads him to a spiritual epiphany. Ordinary people begin to fear him, believing him to be a mutant in disguise. When the sea finally parts, he comes to the sunken city, sobbing to God to atone for the sins of mankind.

In the finale, the housewife, previously scornful of religion and mutants, also experiences an epiphany under the Visitor's influence. The Visitor, on the other hand, finally falls into a religious frenzy and can only thrash and scream for God.

Cast

References

External links
 
 

1989 films
1980s science fiction drama films
Films directed by Konstantin Lopushansky
Soviet post-apocalyptic films
Russian dystopian films
Russian science fiction horror films
Russian science fiction drama films
Soviet science fiction horror films
Soviet science fiction drama films
1980s Russian-language films
1989 drama films
Films about disability